Provincial Highway No. 61, usually known as the West Coast Expressway (西部濱海快速公路), is a highway that runs along the west coast of Taiwan. Several sections of the highway are freeway standards with no at-grade intersections, while the rest are local highway standards. There are several sections open for traffic. Others are still under construction.

Major cities along the route
New Taipei
Taoyuan
Hsinchu
Taichung
Tainan

Exit list

Intersections with other freeways and expressways
Provincial Highway 64 at Exit 4 (Bali 2) in Bali, New Taipei
Provincial Highway 66 at Exit 48 (Guanyin) in Guanyin, Taoyuan
Freeway 3 at Exit 90 (West Coast) in Zhunan, Miaoli
Provincial Highway 78 at Exit 233 (Taixi Junction) in Taixi, Yunlin
Provincial Highway 82 at Exit 262 (Dongshi 2) in Dongshi, Chiayi
Provincial Highway 84 at Exit 283 (Beimen Junction) in Beimen, Tainan

Auxiliary routes

Provincial Highway 61A

Provincial Highway No. 61A started at the Port of Taipei and ended at an interchange with Provincial Highway 15. It connected PH 61 to the Port of Taipei.

PH 61A was defunct and merged into PH 61 on June 29, 2020.

Exit list
The entire route was in Bali, New Taipei City.
{| class="plainrowheaders wikitable"
|-
!scope=col|km
!scope=col|Mile
!scope=col|Exit
!scope=col|Name
!scope=col|Destinations
!scope=col|Notes
|-
!scope="row" style="text-align: right;"|0.000
!scope="row" style="text-align: right;"|0.000
|
|Port of Taipei End
|Bali, Port of Taipei
|Northern terminus
|-
!scope="row" style="text-align: right;"|2.888
!scope="row" style="text-align: right;"|1.795
|
|Bali
|
|Southern terminus
|-
!scope="row" style="text-align: right;"|2.888
!scope="row" style="text-align: right;"|1.795
|bgcolor="#dff9f9" |
|bgcolor="#dff9f9" |
|bgcolor="#dff9f9" |
|bgcolor="#dff9f9" |Continuation beyond southern terminus

Provincial Highway 61B

Provincial Highway No. 61B (Changhua Coastal Industrial Park - Hemei IC.) is one of two branch lines of Provincial Highway No. 61. It starts at Shengang Township and ends at National Highway No. 3 Hemei Interchange, Changhua County, which connects National Highway No. 3 and Provincial Highway No. 61. Its length is 6.355 km (3.949 mi).

Dual use
The Highway has been constructed in such a way that it can be used as a defensive line in the event of a Chinese invasion.

References

External links
 Directorate General of Highways, Taiwan

Highways in Taiwan